Leandro Mateus Barbosa (born November 28, 1982), also known as Leandrinho Barbosa, is a Brazilian former professional basketball player who is an assistant coach for the Sacramento Kings of the National Basketball Association (NBA). He also represented the senior Brazilian national basketball team. He previously won the NBA Sixth Man of the Year Award, with the Suns in 2007, and an NBA championship with Golden State in 2015. In Brazil, he is also commonly known by his nickname "Leandrinho" ("Little Leandro") Barbosa, and in the United States he was nicknamed "The Brazilian Blur", referring to his playing speed. At a height of 1.92 m (6' 3") tall, he played at the shooting guard position.

Early career
Barbosa started his career with Palmeiras when he was 17. He played in the regional São Paulo State Championship, under the command of Lula Ferreira, who went on to become the senior Brazilian national team's head coach.

At 19, while playing in the regional São Paulo State Championship with Palmeiras, he averaged 14.2 points per game. After that, he was traded to the Brazilian club Bauru, in January 2001.

During his first season as a professional in Brazil, while playing with Tilibra/Bauru, he was coached by Jorge "Guerrinha" Guerra. He averaged 15.8 points, 6.4 assists, and 1.7 steals per game. He was named the São Paulo State Championship's 2001 Rookie of the Year. Barbosa ended the season as the regional competition's fourth-ranked player in three-point field goal percentage, sixth in assists, and eleventh in field goals. In 2002, he won Brazil's top-tier level league, the Brazilian Championship, as a member of Bauru. Barbosa was also selected to the senior Brazilian national team, and he played at the 2002 FIBA World Championship.

Professional career

Phoenix Suns (2003–2010)

At 6'3" with a 6'10" wingspan, Barbosa was selected 28th overall in the 2003 NBA draft by the San Antonio Spurs, but his rights were acquired by the Suns in a trade for a future protected first-round draft pick.

Barbosa holds the Suns record for points scored in a game by a rookie as a first-time starter, with 27 against the Chicago Bulls on January 5, 2004. He set the Suns' record for three-point field goals by a rookie in consecutive games when he hit at least one three-pointer per game during a ten-game streak from January 2 to 19.

During the 2006–2007 season, Barbosa averaged 18.1 points, 2.7 rebounds, 4.0 assists and 32.7 minutes per game despite playing off the bench and was the recipient of the 2006–07 NBA Sixth Man of the Year Award.

He scored a career-high of 41 points against the Oklahoma City Thunder on February 20, 2009.

Toronto Raptors (2010–2012)
On July 14, 2010, Barbosa was traded along with Dwayne Jones to the Toronto Raptors in exchange for Hedo Türkoğlu.

On August 18, 2011, Barbosa signed with Flamengo Basketball of Brazil for the duration of the 2011 NBA lockout. His deal had an out-clause that would allow him to return to the NBA once the lockout ended. With the lockout concluding in December 2011, he returned to the Raptors.

Indiana Pacers (2012)
On March 15, 2012, Barbosa was traded to the Indiana Pacers for a future second-round pick. With the help of Barbosa, Indiana improved significantly enough to make it to the second round of the playoffs before losing to the Miami Heat.

Boston Celtics (2012–2013)
On October 18, 2012, Barbosa signed with the Boston Celtics.

On February 12, 2013, after a game against the Charlotte Bobcats on February 11, it was confirmed that Barbosa had suffered a torn ACL in his left knee. This injury ruled him out for the rest of the 2012–13 season. He was the third member of the team whose injury ended his season early in a span of three weeks, joining Rajon Rondo and Jared Sullinger.

Washington Wizards (2013)
On February 21, 2013, Barbosa and Jason Collins were traded to the Washington Wizards in exchange for Jordan Crawford. Despite being on the team during that time, he'd never play for the Wizards in the process.

Esporte Clube Pinheiros (2013–2014)
On November 19, 2013, Barbosa signed with the Esporte Clube Pinheiros of Brazil for the 2013–14 season. During this time, he averaged over 20 points, 3 rebounds, and 3 assists for the team. In January 2014, he returned to the United States to play in the NBA once again.

Second stint with Phoenix (2014)
On January 8, 2014, Barbosa signed a 10-day contract with the Phoenix Suns. Barbosa would immediately play for the Suns in their 104–103 close victory over the Minnesota Timberwolves. He'd have his best night during the first 10-day contract on January 13 against the New York Knicks when Barbosa would score 21 points, which was his first 20+ point game since 2012, back when he played for Boston. However, Barbosa would have a right shoulder strain after the game.

On January 18, Barbosa signed a second 10-day contract with the Suns. He'd make his first home debut with the Suns in over 4 years a day later in a 117–103 blowout victory against the Denver Nuggets. During his second 10-day contract, Barbosa's best performance came on January 24 at home against the Washington Wizards, where he would score 10 points against them.

On January 28, 2014, following the Suns' road game against the Philadelphia 76ers, which subsequently marked the end of his second 10-day contract, the Suns liked Barbosa's production for the team and they decided to sign him for the rest of the 2013–14 NBA season. On March 4, 2014, in a game against the Los Angeles Clippers at home, Barbosa fractured his right hand, and as a result, he missed the rest of the season.

Golden State Warriors (2014–2016)

On September 10, 2014, Barbosa signed with the Golden State Warriors following his great performance at the 2014 FIBA Basketball World Cup. On December 30, 2014, he scored a season-high 17 points in a 126–86 win over the Philadelphia 76ers. Barbosa won his first NBA championship with the Warriors after they defeated the Cleveland Cavaliers in the 2015 NBA Finals in six games.

On July 13, 2015, Barbosa re-signed with the Warriors. In 2015–16, Barbosa helped the Warriors win an NBA record 73 games to eclipse the 72 wins set by the 1995–96 Chicago Bulls. The Warriors made it to the 2016 NBA Finals after overcoming a 3–1 loss against the Oklahoma City Thunder in the Western Conference Finals. In Game 1 of the NBA Finals against the Cleveland Cavaliers, Barbosa returned from a minor back hurt to score 11 points on 5-of-5 shooting off the bench in a 104–89 win.

Third stint with Phoenix (2016–2017)
On July 19, 2016, Barbosa signed a multi-year deal with the Phoenix Suns, returning to the franchise for a third stint just weeks before playing for his home nation at the 2016 Summer Olympics in Rio de Janeiro. On December 9, 2016, Barbosa scored a season-high 21 points and hit five three-pointers in a 119–115 win over the Los Angeles Lakers. On December 28, 2016, in a loss to the San Antonio Spurs, Barbosa played his 517th game with the Suns, moving him past Amar'e Stoudemire in to 10th on the Suns' all-time games played list. On March 3, 2017 against the Oklahoma City Thunder, Barbosa made his 544th appearance in a Suns jersey, passing Mark West for 9th all-time in games played. His 14 points also pushed him past Connie Hawkins for 14th in all-time scoring with Phoenix. On July 3, 2017, he was waived by the Suns.

Barbosa's final game in his NBA career was played on March 24th, 2017 in a 120 - 130 loss to the Boston Celtics where he recorded 11 points, 5 rebounds and 1 steal.

Franca Basquetebol Clube (2017–2018)
On November 17, 2017, Barbosa returned to Brazil and signed with Franca.

Minas Storm Basquete (2018–2020)
On December 13, Barbosa signed with Minas. In the 2019–2020 season
Barbosa was the league's leading scorer at 20.1 points per game before the season shut down due to the COVID-19 pandemic. He and his then-pregnant wife contracted the virus but both recovered.

Retirement
On September 14, 2020, Barbosa announced his retirement from professional basketball.

Coaching career
On September 14, 2020, the Golden State Warriors announced that Barbosa would return as a player mentor coach. He won his second NBA championship after the Warriors defeated the Boston Celtics in six games in the 2022 NBA Finals. In July 2022, Barbosa would join the Sacramento Kings as an assistant coach under Mike Brown.

NBA career statistics

Regular season

|-
| style="text-align:left;"|
| style="text-align:left;"|Phoenix
| 70 || 46 || 21.4 || .447|| .395 || .770 || 1.8 || 2.4 || 1.3 || .1 || 7.9
|-
| style="text-align:left;"|
| style="text-align:left;"|Phoenix
| 63 || 6 || 17.3 || .475 || .367 || .797 || 2.1 || 2.0 || .5 || .1 || 7.0
|-
| style="text-align:left;"|
| style="text-align:left;"|Phoenix
| 57 || 11 || 27.9 || .481 || .444 || .755 || 2.6 || 2.8 || .8 || .1 || 13.1
|-
| style="text-align:left;"|
| style="text-align:left;"|Phoenix
| 80 || 18 || 32.7 || .476 || .434 || .845 || 2.7 || 4.0 || 1.2 || .2 || 18.1
|-
| style="text-align:left;"|
| style="text-align:left;"|Phoenix
| 82 || 12 || 29.5 || .462 || .389 || .822 || 2.8 || 2.6 || .9 || .2 || 15.6
|-
| style="text-align:left;"|
| style="text-align:left;"|Phoenix
| 70 || 11 || 24.4 || .482 || .375 || .881 || 2.6 || 2.3 || 1.2 || .1 || 14.2
|-
| style="text-align:left;"|
| style="text-align:left;"|Phoenix
| 44 || 5 || 17.9 || .425 || .324 || .877 || 1.6 || 1.5 || .5 || .3 || 9.5
|-
| style="text-align:left;"|
| style="text-align:left;"|Toronto
| 58 || 0 || 24.1 || .450 || .338 || .796 || 1.7 || 2.1 || .9 || .1 || 13.3
|-
| style="text-align:left;"|
| style="text-align:left;"|Toronto
| 42 || 0 || 22.5 || .436 || .360 || .835 || 1.9 || 1.5 || .9 || .2 || 12.2
|-
| style="text-align:left;"|
| style="text-align:left;"|Indiana
| 22 || 0 || 19.8 || .399 || .424 || .758 || 2.2 || 1.5 || .9 || .0 || 8.9
|-
| style="text-align:left;"|
| style="text-align:left;"|Boston
| 41 || 2 || 12.5 || .430 || .383 || .756 || 1.1 || 1.4 || .4 || .1 || 5.2
|-
| style="text-align:left;"|
| style="text-align:left;"|Phoenix
| 20 || 0 || 18.4 || .427 || .280 || .795 || 1.9 || 1.6 || .4 || .2 || 7.5
|-
| style="text-align:left; background:#afe6ba;"|†
| style="text-align:left;"|Golden State
| 66 || 1 || 14.9 ||.474 || .384 || .784 || 1.4 || 1.5 || .6 || .1 || 7.1
|-
| style="text-align:left;"|
| style="text-align:left;"|Golden State
| 68 || 0 || 15.9 || .462 || .355 || .839 || 1.7 || 1.2 || .6 || .1 || 6.4
|-
| style="text-align:left;"|
| style="text-align:left;"|Phoenix
| 67 || 0 || 14.4 || .439 || .357 || .889 || 1.6 || 1.2 || .5 || .1 || 6.3
|- class="sortbottom"
| style="text-align:center;" colspan="2"|Career
| 850 || 112 || 21.6 || .459 || .387 || .821 || 2.0 || 2.1 || .8 || .1 || 10.6

Playoffs

|-
| style="text-align:left;"|2005
| style="text-align:left;"|Phoenix
| 12 || 0 || 9.7 || .343 || .400 || .500 || 1.4 || 1.0 || .3 || .0 || 2.5
|-
| style="text-align:left;"|2006
| style="text-align:left;"|Phoenix
| 20 || 3 || 31.6 || .470 || .391 || .862 || 1.6 || 2.7 || .8 || .2 || 14.2
|-
| style="text-align:left;"|2007
| style="text-align:left;"|Phoenix
| 11 || 1 || 31.7 || .405 || .305 || .718 || 3.5 || 2.2 || 1.1 || .2 || 15.8
|-
| style="text-align:left;"|2008
| style="text-align:left;"|Phoenix
| 5 || 1 || 28.6 || .345 || .222 || .909 || 4.0 || 1.8 || .6 || .0 || 10.4
|-
| style="text-align:left;"|2010
| style="text-align:left;"|Phoenix
| 16 || 0 || 15.6 || .417 || .343 || .708 || 1.3 || 1.3 || .3 || .1 || 7.2
|-
| style="text-align:left;"|2012
| style="text-align:left;"|Indiana
| 11 || 0 || 20.3 || .370 || .150 || .500 || 2.2 || 1.3 || .5 || .1 || 5.7
|-
| style="text-align:left;background:#afe6ba;"|2015†
| style="text-align:left;"|Golden State
| 21 || 0 || 10.9 || .443 || .348 || .818 || 1.3 || .9 || .3 || .0 || 5.0
|-
| style="text-align:left;"|2016
| style="text-align:left;"|Golden State
| 23 || 0 || 11.0 || .580 || .393 || .762 || 1.2 || .7 || .5 || .0 || 5.6
|- class="sortbottom"
| style="text-align:center;" colspan="2"|Career
| 119 || 5 || 18.5 || .437 || .332 || .770 || 1.7 || 1.4 || .5 || .1 || 8.0

National team career
Barbosa was a longtime member of the senior Brazilian national basketball team. With Brazil, he played at the following major tournaments: the 2002 FIBA World Cup, the 2003 FIBA AmeriCup, the 2005 FIBA AmeriCup, the 2006 FIBA World Cup, the 2007 FIBA AmeriCup, the 2009 FIBA AmeriCup, the 2010 FIBA World Cup, the 2012 Summer Olympics, the 2014 FIBA World Cup, and the 2016 Summer Olympics.

He was the top scorer of the 2007 FIBA AmeriCup.

Personal life
Barbosa lived with Brazilian actress Samara Felippo from 2008 to 2013. They have two daughters, born in 2009 and 2013.

Barbosa is married to the international top model Talita Rocca. The ceremony was held on July 6, 2019, in Brazil.

References

External links

FIBA Profile
Latinbasket.com Profile
New Basket Brazil Profile 
2003 NBA draft Profile

1982 births
Living people
2002 FIBA World Championship players
2006 FIBA World Championship players
2010 FIBA World Championship players
2014 FIBA Basketball World Cup players
2019 FIBA Basketball World Cup players
Associação Bauru Basketball players
Basketball players at the 2012 Summer Olympics
Basketball players at the 2016 Summer Olympics
Basketball players from São Paulo
Big3 players
Boston Celtics players
Brazilian expatriate basketball people in Canada
Brazilian expatriate basketball people in the United States
Brazilian men's basketball players
Esporte Clube Pinheiros basketball players
Flamengo basketball players
Franca Basquetebol Clube players
Golden State Warriors players
Indiana Pacers players
Minas Tênis Clube basketball players
National Basketball Association players from Brazil
Novo Basquete Brasil players
Olympic basketball players of Brazil
Phoenix Suns players
Point guards
San Antonio Spurs draft picks
Shooting guards
Sociedade Esportiva Palmeiras basketball players
Toronto Raptors players
3x3 basketball players
Sportspeople from São Paulo